The Diocese of the Southeast is a Reformed Episcopal Church diocese and as such an Anglican Church in North America founding diocese. The diocese comprises 32 parishes, 30 in South Carolina and 2 in Georgia, in the United States. Its headquarters are located in Summerville, South Carolina. The current bishop ordinary is Willie J. Hill Jr., who was installed in September 2022.

History
The Diocese of the Southeast, previously the Missionary Jurisdiction of the South, origin goes back to 1865, on the aftermath of the Civil War, with the work of Peter Fayssoux Stevens, a former Confederate colonel, a member of the Protestant Episcopal Church. He reunited former parishioners and many black freedmen and started working for the establishment of a new church for the coloured people, that would be Immanuel Church, in Berkeley County, South Carolina. Four years later, he already had organized three large congregations of freedmen.

In December 1874, in a convention held in Pinopolis, with members of four parishes, after the rejection of four black men from the ministry by the Protestant Episcopal Church, it was decided to leave the Diocese of South Carolina and to seek membership with the newly created Reformed Episcopal Church. In the same convention, Frank Crawford Ferguson was elected President and wrote to the Presiding Bishop of the Reformed Episcopal Church, George Cummins. In June 1875, he received a letter by Benjamin Johnson, explaining that he had been sent by the General Council of the REC to receive all the black people willing to join the denomination. The new body would be the Missionary Jurisdiction of the South, named Diocese of the Southeast when the division into dioceses was adopted in 1984.

The diocese was a founding jurisdiction of the Anglican Church in North America, as part of the Reformed Episcopal Church, in 2009.

The Diocese of the Southeast is the home of the Cummins Theological Seminary, in Summerville, South Carolina.

List of bishops ordinary
Bishops prior to 1984 were bishops of the Missionary Jurisdiction of the South; bishops from 1984 to the present were bishops of the Diocese of the Southeast.

 Peter Fayssoux Stevens (1879–1909)
 Arthur L. Pengelley (1909–1922)
 Joseph E. Kearney	(1922–1958)
 William H. S. Jerdan Jr. (1958–1986)
 Sanco K. Rembert	(1986–1998)
 James C. West	(1998–2006)
 Alphonza Gadsden Sr (2007–2019)
 William J. White (2020–2022)
 Willie J. Hill Jr. (2022–present)

References

External links
Diocese of the Southeast Official Website

Dioceses of the Anglican Church in North America
Religion in the Southern United States
Dioceses of the Reformed Episcopal Church